The 2006–07 Liga Artzit season saw Hapoel Ramat Gan win the title and promotion to Liga Leumit alongside runners-up Ironi Rishon LeZion. Hapoel Herzliya and Maccabi Be'er Sheva were relegated to Liga Alef.

Final table

References
Israel Third Level 2006/07 RSSSF

Liga Artzit seasons
3
Israel